Emma Mitchell may refer to:
 Emma Mukandi (née Mitchell), Scottish footballer
 Emma Mitchell (politician), Ghanaian politician